Simon III, Bishop of Paderborn (born 1430, died 1498 in Dringenburg) was a German clergyman and bishop/prince for the Roman Catholic Archdiocese of Paderborn. He was ordained in 1463. He was appointed bishop in 1463. He died in 1498.

References 

1430 births
1498 deaths
German Roman Catholic bishops